Adlai E. Stevenson High School was a New York City public high school located at 1980 Lafayette Avenue, in the Soundview section of the Bronx.

The New York City Department of Education closed the school in June 2009, owing to poor performance (high truancy, violence and a low graduation rate).  New, specialty schools were created as part of the New Century Schools initiative. The high schools on the Stevenson Campus are:
 Bronx Community High School
 Bronx Guild (X452) 
 Gateway School for Environmental Research and Technology (X295)
Millennium Art Academy (X312)
Pablo Neruda Academy for Architecture and World Studies (X305)
School for Community Research and Learning (X540)
Bronx Compass (X561)
In addition to the five high schools, two middle schools are collocated on campus:
Bronx Bridges High School (X432)
Antonia Pantoja Preparatory Academy, A College Board School (X376)

Notable alumni
Ed Pinckney - (b 1963) is a former NBA basketball player for the Boston Celtics.

See also
List of high schools in New York City

References

External links
Statistics about the school
Adlai E. Stevenson Educational Campus Library

Public high schools in the Bronx
Soundview, Bronx
Educational institutions disestablished in 2009
2009 disestablishments in New York (state)